Minnesota State Highway 277 (MN 277) was a  highway in west-central Minnesota. It ran from its intersection with State Highway 7 in Stoneham Township near Clara City and Maynard; and continued to its northern terminus at its intersection with State Highway 40 in Louriston Township, 20 miles west of Willmar.

In 2019, the route was marked as Chippewa County State-Aid Highway 4.

Route description
Highway 277 served as a north–south connector route in west-central Minnesota between State Highways 7 and 40. It passed through the unincorporated town of Gluek.

The roadway followed 60th Avenue SE and 60th Avenue NE in Chippewa County.

The route was legally defined as Route 277 in the Minnesota Statutes.

History
Highway 277 was authorized on July 1, 1949.

The route was paved in 1956.

On September 16, 2019, the state transferred ownership to Chippewa County and the road is no longer part of the state highway system.

Major intersections

References

External links

Highway 277 at the Unofficial Minnesota Highways Page

277
Transportation in Chippewa County, Minnesota